İncirli is a village in the Çelikhan District of Adıyaman Province in Turkey. The village had a population of 96 in 2021.

It was a hamlet of Yağızatlı until 2015.

References 

Kurdish settlements in Adıyaman Province
Villages in Çelikhan District